The 1932 South Australian National Football League season was the 53rd season of the top-level Australian rules football competition in South Australia.

Ladder

Finals series

Grand Final

References 

SANFL
South Australian National Football League seasons